Macronychia is a genus of satellite flies in the family Sarcophagidae. There are at least 20 described species in Macronychia.

Species 
These 21 species belong to the genus Macronychia:

M. agrestis (Fallén, 1810) c g
M. agrestris g
M. alpestris (Rondani, 1865) c g
M. aurata (Coquillett, 1902) i c g b
M. aurifrons Hall, 1937 c g
 M. auromaculata (Townsend, 1915) c g
M. confundens (Townsend, 1915) i c g
M. dolini Verves, 2005 c g
M. griseola (Fallén, 1820) c g
M. kanoi Kurahashi, 1972 c g
 M. lemariei Jacentkovsky, 1941 c g
 M. lopesi Verves, 1983 c g
 M. malayana Kurahashi & Pape, 1996 c g
M. ornata (Townsend, 1917) c
 M. polyodon (Meigen, 1824) c g
 M. richterae Verves, 2005 c g
 M. seguyi Verves & Richet, 2009 g
M. striginervis (Zetterstedt, 1844) i c g
M. substriginervis Verves, 2005 c g
M. townsendi Verves, 1983 i c g
M. xuei Verves, 2005 c g

Data sources: i = ITIS, c = Catalogue of Life, g = GBIF, b = Bugguide.net

References

Further reading

 

Sarcophagidae
Articles created by Qbugbot
Oestroidea genera
Taxa named by Camillo Rondani